White goods may refer to:

 Major appliance, in British English
 Linens, in American English
 Pottery or whiteware, in New Zealand